İnegölspor is a Turkish sports club located in İnegöl, Bursa Province. The football team currently plays in the TFF Second League. The club also played in the old Second League between 1985–1993 and 1996–1997.

Current squad

References

External links 
Official website
İnegölspor on TFF.org

Sport in Bursa
Football clubs in Turkey
Association football clubs established in 1954